Kutay is a Turkish name and may refer to:

Kutay is also found in Kashmir region of India

 Kutay Eryoldas, Turkish figure skater
 Ecmel Kutay, Turkish general
 Mehmet Kutay Şenyıl, Turkish footballer
 Taha Islam Coburn-Kutay: Kashmiri Origin Community Leader in UK
 Kutay Büyükboyacı, Turkish Karamanase swimmer , 13 years old now 14 years old

Turkish-language surnames
Turkish masculine given names